Gylfi Zoega (born February 14, 1963) is an Icelandic economist who has gained prominence as an academic and active contributor to the economic policy debate in Iceland, especially during the Icelandic financial crisis of 2008–2010. He appears in the film Inside Job which uses the Icelandic financial crisis as a lead-in to its focus, the 2008 economic crisis in the United States and its origins.

Education
Zoega received the Ph.D. degree in economics from Columbia University, New York, New York, USA in 1993 and the M.Phil. in 1991. Earlier he received the M.A. degree from the same university in 1989 and a B.A. degree in Economics and Business Administration from the University of Iceland in Reykjavík in 1987. Zoega specialises in macroeconomics and labour economics and has written numerous articles on the subject, including several co-authored with Nobel laureate Edmund Phelps.

Career
Currently, a professor in Economics at Birkbeck College in London, Zoega is a member of the Monetary Policy Committee of the Central Bank of Iceland.  Zoega has also taught at the University of Iceland and Columbia University.

Public debate
Zoega has offered an assessment of the monetary policy during the upswing and reforms going forward. In addition to numerous basic reforms, a main conclusion is that the Central Bank should be granted macroprudential instruments to support the goal of price stability.

References

External links 
 Birkbeck College website
 Central Bank of Iceland's website 

1963 births
Living people
Icelandic economists
20th-century economists
21st-century economists